Jaroslav of Bezmíře, also known as Jaroslav of Benešov, was a Bohemian inquisitor and Bishop of Sarepta.

Jaroslav was appointed Bishop of Sarepta by Pope Boniface IX on 15 July 1394. He was considered a very active Bishop, and likely began to act as a inquisitor in 1407. He advised Zbynĕk Zajíc of Hasenburg at the Roman Curia. In 1410, he participated in the trial in Bologna that condemned the writings of John Wycliffe.

In popular culture
A fictionalized Jaroslav, named Inquisitor Jaroslav, is portrayed in the 2018 video game Kingdom Come: Deliverance.

References

14th-century Roman Catholic bishops in Bohemia
Inquisitors